Maccabi Düsseldorf was a German association football club based in the city of Düsseldorf, North Rhine-Westphalia.

History
The club was founded in 1923.

The rise to power in Germany of the Nazis in the early 30s led to discrimination against Jews and by 1933 Jewish teams were excluded from general competition and limited to play in separate leagues or tournaments. In 1938 Jewish teams were banned outright as discrimination turned to persecution.

In the aftermath of World War II Jewish sports and cultural associations eventually re-emerged in Germany with Maccabi Düsseldorf leading the way with its re-establishment in 1965. Through the 70s and 80s the club grew to include departments for basketball, gymnastics, and table tennis.

The club last fielded a senior football team in the 2008–09 season when it played in the Kreisliga C but has been inactive since. The club's other departments have remained active however.

References

External links
 Official team website

Association football clubs established in 1923
Maccabi football clubs outside Israel
Jewish football clubs
Football clubs in Germany
Football clubs in North Rhine-Westphalia
Jews and Judaism in Germany
Sport in Düsseldorf
Sports clubs banned by the Nazis
1923 establishments in Germany